Dracula is a 1995 stage adaptation co-authored and by John Godber and Jane Thornton from Bram Stoker's 1897 novel of the same title.  Its world premier was at the Spring Street Theatre, home of Hull Truck Theatre at Kingston upon Hull, East Riding of Yorkshire.

References

Further reading

External links

The Grand Theatre Blackpool

1995 plays
Horror plays
Plays by John Godber
Plays based on Dracula